Pauline Mary Edwards MBE (born 23 April 1949) is a British archer who represented Great Britain internationally at archery at the 1972 and 1988 Summer Olympic Games as well as several World Archery Championships.

Career 

She finished 25th in the women's individual event with a score of 2249 points.

Edwards competed at the 1985 World Archery Championships in Seoul and finished fourth.

At the 1988 Summer Olympic Games she finished seventeenth in the women's individual event and fifth in the women's team event.

References

External links 
 Profile on olympic.org

1949 births
Living people
British female archers
Olympic archers of Great Britain
Archers at the 1972 Summer Olympics
Archers at the 1988 Summer Olympics
Members of the Order of the British Empire
20th-century British women